Himachal Pradesh Public Service Commission, known commonly as HPPSC, is a government agency and topmost constitutional body of Government of Himachal Pradesh constituted on 8 April 1971. It is responsible for conducting Civil Services examinations and Competitive Examinations to select the eligible candidates for various  civil services and departmental posts.

History
The foundation of HPPSC came into existence on 1 November 1966 when the state governor requested President of India to establish a civil service body for the Himachal Pradesh state. It was originally established under the provisions of Act, 318 of Constitution of India which authorized the state government to form state public service commission.

Functions and responsibilities
As amended in Article 320 of the Constitution of India, the State Public Service Commission is granted to perform the following functions:
To conduct examinations for appointments to the services in its respective state.
If Union Public Service Commission requested by two or more state commissions in assisting framing, or operating schemes of joint recruitment for any service for which candidates possessing special qualifications are required.
To make appointments to state civil services.
To promote and transfer from one service to another and to check the suitability of candidates for such decisions.

Commission profile
HPPSC consists of various members and a chairman that are appointed or removed by the state governor. Their term of service is set to fixed period which starts from the date of appointment.

See also

 List of Public service commissions in India

References 

Government of Himachal Pradesh
1971 establishments in Himachal Pradesh
State public service commissions of India